Kemal Aslan (born 24 October 1981) is a Turkish professional footballer who plays as a midfielder.

Honours

Fenerbahçe
Süper Lig: 2003–04, 2004–05, 2006–07
Turkish Super Cup: 2007

References

External links 
Profile at TFF.org

1981 births
Living people
Turkish footballers
Turkey under-21 international footballers
Gaziantep F.K. footballers
Gaziantepspor footballers
Fenerbahçe S.K. footballers
Kocaelispor footballers
Bursaspor footballers
Çaykur Rizespor footballers
Adanaspor footballers
Denizlispor footballers
Süper Lig players
Sportspeople from Gaziantep
Turkey youth international footballers
Association football midfielders
21st-century Turkish people